This is a list of episodes of Super-Vocal Season 2 in 2019. Super-Vocal Season 2 started broadcast on Hunan TV on July 19, 2019.

Singers

Episodes

References

2019 Chinese television seasons